Ingleside is a historic home located at Alexandria Bay in Jefferson County, New York.  It is a large frame and stone residence built about 1900 in an eclectic Shingle style.  It is a -story summer home.  Also on the property is an icehouse, combined boathouse / guesthouse, private island, square gazebo, terraced pool, and pumphouse with observation deck.

It was listed on the National Register of Historic Places in 1980.

References

Houses on the National Register of Historic Places in New York (state)
Queen Anne architecture in New York (state)
Shingle Style houses
Houses in Jefferson County, New York
National Register of Historic Places in Jefferson County, New York
Shingle Style architecture in New York (state)